The 2012–13 Amlin Challenge Cup pool stage was the opening stage of the 17th season of the European Challenge Cup, the second-tier competition for European rugby union clubs. It began with a match between Mont-de-Marsan and Gloucester on Thursday 11 October 2012 and ended on 19 January 2013 when Stade Français hosted competition newcomers London Welsh.

Twenty teams participated in this phase of the competition; they were divided into five pools of four teams each, with each team playing the others home and away. Competition points are earned using the standard bonus point system. The pool winners advanced to the knockout stage, where they were joined by three entrants from the Heineken Cup pool stage. These teams then competed in a single-elimination tournament that ended with the final at the RDS Arena in Dublin on 17 May 2012.

Results
All times are local to the game location.

{| class="wikitable"
|+ Key to colours
|-
| style="background:#cfc;"|    
|Winner of each pool advances to quarterfinals. Seed # in parentheses.
|}

Pool 1

Pool 2

Per the Competition Rules, Perpignan and Worcester were level on the first tiebreaker of head-to-head competition points (5–5); Perpignan topped the pool on the second tiebreaker of head-to-head try count (3–1).

Pool 3

Pool 4

Pool 5

 Grenoble won the game 20–9, but London Welsh were retroactively awarded a 28–0 victory and five match points, after Grenoble admitted fielding an ineligible player, Lotu Taukeiaho, during the match.

See also
European Challenge Cup
2012–13 Heineken Cup

References

pool stage
2012-13